Vithalrao Madhavrao Jadhav (born 30 October 1937) is an Indian politician. He was a Member of Parliament, representing Maharashtra in the Rajya Sabha the upper house of India's Parliament as a member of the Indian National Congress.

References

Rajya Sabha members from Maharashtra
Indian National Congress politicians
1937 births
Living people
Indian National Congress politicians from Maharashtra